Alexander St Clair (1672-1706) was the 19th Baron of Roslin.

Early life

He was the second son of James St Clair, 18th Baron of Roslin and Jean, daughter of Henry Spotswood, Sheriff of Dublin. His elder brother, James St Clair, had been killed fighting at the Battle of the Boyne in 1690 and therefore Alexander succeeded to the estates of Roslin.

Baron of Roslin

He was of considerable poetical ability and his poems are preserved in manuscript form in the Advocates Library.

Family

He married Jean, daughter of Robert, 7th Lord Sempill and was succeeded by his son, William St Clair of Roslin. He also had two other sons and three daughters who died young. He died in 1706.

See also

Lord Sinclair
Earl of Caithness
Lord Herdmanston

References

Alexander
Alexander
1706 deaths
1672 births